Herman Willem van der Weele (8 October 1879 – 29 August 1910) was a Dutch entomologist. He was the son of Dutch painter Herman Johannes van der Weele (1852–1930).

Works 
 Ascalaphiden: monographisch. HW van der Weele, ME baron de Sélys-Longchamps – 1908
 New genera and species of Megaloptera Latr. HW Van der Weele – Notes from the Leyden Museum, 1909
 Mecoptera and Planipennia of insulinde. HW Van der Weele, E Jacobson – Notes from the Leyden Museum, 1909
 Megaloptera (Latreille): monographic revision. HW van der Weele – 1910

References

External links 
 

1879 births
1910 deaths
Dutch entomologists
Leiden University alumni
University of Bern alumni
Scientists from The Hague
Deaths from cholera